State Road 304 (NM 304) is a  state highway in the US state of New Mexico. NM 304's northern terminus is at NM 47 in Rio Communities, and the southern terminus is at Calle De Centro Street in La Joya.

Major intersections

See also

References

304
Transportation in Socorro County, New Mexico
Transportation in Valencia County, New Mexico